The Crazy Canucks was the nickname for a group of World Cup alpine ski racers from Canada who rose to prominence in the 1970s and 1980s. Jungle Jim Hunter, Dave Irwin, Dave Murray, Steve Podborski, and Ken Read earned themselves a reputation for fast and seemingly reckless skiing in the downhill event.

History
These five men earned their title "Crazy Canucks" from ski journalist and World Cup co-founder Serge Lange, who after watching their different styles came up with the name that caught on with sports journalists throughout the skiing world. Other similar nicknames included "Kamikaze Canadians."

These five men were at the top of their game and better known in Europe than in North America.  Once they hit the Alps, they consistently challenged the Europeans on the World Cup circuit at a level previously unseen.

Canadian Corner is a section of the Lauberhorn downhill course near Wengen, Switzerland. The heavily twisting curve at the left-hand transition to the Alpweg is named after the Crazy Canucks, Dave Irwin and Ken Read, who fell there in 1976.

From here the route briefly follows the valley of the Hasenbach parallel to the Wengernalpbahn. The Girmschbiel hill on the opposite side of the small valley has become a fan stadium in the middle of the route for several years thanks to its location right next to the Wengernalp train station. More than 10,000 visitors follow the race on the hill and in the bars and VIP zones temporarily set up there - only here do they have a direct view of the famous key points Hundschopf, Minsch-Kante, and Canadian Corner. 

Four of the five "Crazy Canucks" live on today; Murray died of skin cancer in 1990 at age 37. The downhill course at Whistler Creekside, utilized for World Cup and Olympic races, was named for him.

In 2006, it was announced that the four original Crazy Canucks would receive stars on Canada's Walk of Fame, inducted as one group. The only other ski racer on the walk is Canadian alpine legend Nancy Greene.

TV film
Crazy Canucks was a TV movie named after and based on the history of the team. It was released in 2004 in Canada. The film was directed by Randy Bradshaw and starred Sandy Robson (Hunter), Lucas Bryant (Read), Curtis Harrison (Podborski), Kyle Labine (Murray) and Robert Tinkler (Irwin).

See also
 Erik Read, Jeffrey Read
 Julia Murray

References

External links
The founding of the Canadian Alpine Ski Team
CBC Digital Archives – The Crazy Canucks: Canada's skiing heroes
Canada's Sports Hall of Fame – photo of Crazy Canucks at 1976 Winter Olympics – (Read, Hunter, Irwin, Murray)
Crazy Canucks IMDb

Alpine skiing
Canadian male alpine skiers
Nicknamed groups of sportspeople
Nicknamed groups of Olympic competitors

it:Nazionale di sci alpino del Canada#I Crazy Canucks